Aleksandr Tsarevich (Łacinka: Aliaksandr Carevič; born ) is a Belarusian male artistic gymnast. He is the 2013 European horizontal bar bronze medalist. He also competed at the 2008 Summer Olympics in Beijing and at multiple world championships, including in 2006, 2007 and 2009.

References

1986 births
Living people
Belarusian male artistic gymnasts
Place of birth missing (living people)
Gymnasts at the 2008 Summer Olympics
Olympic gymnasts of Belarus
21st-century Belarusian people